Jan-Lennard Struff was the defending champion but chose not to participate.

Alessandro Giannessi won the title after defeating Dustin Brown 6–2, 6–3 in the final.

Seeds

Draw

Finals

Top half

Bottom half

References
Main Draw
Qualifying Draw

Pekao Szczecin Open - Singles